The Kamianka or the Kamianetskyi waterfall is located on the Kamianka river in the National Park Dubyna, Skole Raion, Lviv Oblast of western Ukraine The waterfall's height is .

See also 
 Waterfalls of Ukraine

External links  
 www.travelwestukraine.net

References 

Waterfalls of Ukraine